Gleaner(Noun)- A highly resourceful individual that utilizes crops and resources left behind by people who squander them.

Newspapers
Gleaner Company, a newspaper publishing enterprise in Jamaica
The Daily Gleaner, a daily newspaper serving Fredericton, New Brunswick and the upper Saint John River Valley
Henderson Gleaner, a daily newspaper in Henderson, Kentucky
Alamance Gleaner, a newspaper which was based in Alamance County, North Carolina
Northeast News Gleaner, a weekly newspaper that served Northeast Philadelphia

Other uses
Gleaners, a non-profit that helps feed the homeless in Jackson, Mississippi
The Gleaners, a painting by Jean-François Millet
Gleaner Manufacturing Company, a manufacturer of combine harvesters
Gleaner A85, a combine harvester
Gleaner E, a combine harvester
HMS Gleaner (1809), a mercantile ketch
HMS Gleaner (J83), a survey vessel launched in 1937 and converted into a minesweeper in 1939
HMSML Gleaner (H86), a survey motor launch in commission since 1983
The Gleaners (album) by Larry Grenadier

See also
Glean (disambiguation)
Gleaner Heights, in the South Shetland Islands, Antarctica
HMS Gleaner, a list of ships of the British Royal Navy
The Gleaners and I, a French documentary film